Autosomal recessive cerebellar ataxia describes a heterogeneous group of rare genetic disorders with an autosomal recessive inheritance pattern and a clinical phenotype involving cerebellar ataxia.

It may refer to:
 Autosomal recessive cerebellar ataxia type 1,  autosomal recessive ataxia, Beauce type
 Autosomal recessive cerebelloparenchymal disorder type 3
 Dysequilibrium syndrome
 CAMOS syndrome
 Cerebellar ataxia, Cayman type
 Joubert syndrome with oculorenal defect
 Joubert syndrome
 Joubert syndrome with hepatic defect
 Orofaciodigital syndrome type 6
 Joubert syndrome with ocular defect
 Joubert syndrome with renal defect
 Joubert syndrome with Jeune asphyxiating thoracic dystrophy
 Autosomal recessive cerebellar ataxia due to CWF19L1 deficiency
 Congenital cerebellar ataxia due to RNU12 mutation
 Ataxia with vitamin E deficiency
 Abetalipoproteinemia
 Refsum disease
 Cerebrotendinous xanthomatosis
 Infantile Refsum disease
 Recessive mitochondrial ataxia syndrome
 Autosomal recessive ataxia due to PEX10 deficiency
 Autosomal recessive cerebellar ataxia with late-onset spasticity
 Autosomal recessive congenital cerebellar ataxia due to MGLUR1 deficiency
 Autosomal recessive congenital cerebellar ataxia due to GRID2 deficiency
 Ataxia-telangiectasia
 Ataxia-oculomotor apraxia type 1
 Spinocerebellar ataxia with axonal neuropathy type 2
 Spinocerebellar ataxia with axonal neuropathy type 1
 Xeroderma pigmentosum-Cockayne syndrome complex
 Ataxia-telangiectasia-like disorder
 Xeroderma pigmentosum
 RIDDLE syndrome
 Friedreich ataxia
 Early-onset cerebellar ataxia with retained tendon reflexes
 Infantile onset spinocerebellar ataxia
 Marinesco-Sjögren syndrome
 Congenital cataracts-facial dysmorphism-neuropathy syndrome
 Posterior column ataxia-retinitis pigmentosa syndrome
 Early-onset progressive encephalopathy-spastic ataxia-distal spinal muscular atrophy syndrome
 Autosomal recessive spinocerebellar ataxia-blindness-deafness syndrome,  spinocerebellar ataxia, autosomal recessive 3 (SCAR3)
 Autosomal recessive cerebellar ataxia-saccadic intrusion syndrome
 Autosomal recessive cerebellar ataxia-psychomotor delay syndrome
 Ataxia-oculomotor apraxia type 4
 Gemignani syndrome,  spinocerebellar ataxia-amyotrophy-deafness syndrome
 Cerebellar ataxia, neuropathy, vestibular areflexia syndrome (CANVAS)
 Acute infantile liver failure-cerebellar ataxia-peripheral sensory motor neuropathy syndrome, aka spinocerebellar ataxia, autosomal recessive 21 (SCAR21)
 Autosomal recessive ataxia due to ubiquinone deficiency
 Adult-onset autosomal recessive cerebellar ataxia
 Childhood-onset autosomal recessive slowly progressive spinocerebellar ataxia
 Infantile-onset autosomal recessive nonprogressive cerebellar ataxia,  spinocerebellar ataxia, autosomal recessive 6 (SCAR6)
 Spectrin-associated autosomal recessive cerebellar ataxia
 Autosomal recessive cerebellar ataxia-epilepsy-intellectual disability syndrome due to WWOX deficiency
 Autosomal recessive cerebellar ataxia-epilepsy-intellectual disability syndrome due to TUD deficiency
 Autosomal recessive cerebellar ataxia-epilepsy-intellectual disability syndrome due to RUBCN deficiency
 Autosomal recessive cerebellar ataxia due to STUB1 deficiency